Cyatholipus is a genus of African araneomorph spiders in the family Cyatholipidae, and was first described by Eugène Simon in 1894. Originally placed with the ray spiders, it was moved to the Cyatholipidae in 1978.

Species
 it contains six species, all found in South Africa:
Cyatholipus avus Griswold, 1987 – South Africa
Cyatholipus hirsutissimus Simon, 1894 (type) – South Africa
Cyatholipus icubatus Griswold, 1987 – South Africa
Cyatholipus isolatus Griswold, 1987 – South Africa
Cyatholipus quadrimaculatus Simon, 1894 – South Africa
Cyatholipus tortilis Griswold, 1987 – South Africa

References

Endemic fauna of South Africa
Araneomorphae genera
Cyatholipidae
Spiders of South Africa
Taxa named by Eugène Simon